Alexander Hudson (born December 31, 1955) is a Canadian retired professional ice hockey player who played two games in the National Hockey League for the Pittsburgh Penguins. Hudson was born in Winnipeg, Manitoba.  Prior to his professional career, Hudson was standout player at the University of Denver

Career statistics

Awards and honors

References

External links

1955 births
Living people
Binghamton Dusters players
Canadian ice hockey defencemen
Cincinnati Stingers (CHL) players
Grand Rapids Owls players
Pittsburgh Penguins draft picks
Pittsburgh Penguins players
Ice hockey people from Winnipeg